Jackie Tzarfati is a retired Israeli footballer who is mainly known for playing in Maccabi Tel Aviv.

Jackie's father Sami and younger brother Guy were also professional footballers.

Honours
Israel State Cup (1):
1988

References

1969 births
Living people
Israeli Jews
Israeli footballers
Maccabi Tel Aviv F.C. players
Maccabi Herzliya F.C. players
Maccabi Yavne F.C. players
Hapoel Ramat Gan F.C. players
Hapoel Bat Yam F.C. players
Hapoel Nahlat Yehuda F.C. players
Liga Leumit players
Israeli Premier League players
Footballers from Tel Aviv
Israeli people of Moroccan-Jewish descent
Association football midfielders